Hans Kleppen (16 March 1907 – 12 April 2009) was a Norwegian ski jumper who competed in the late 1920s. He won a bronze medal on the individual large hill competition at the 1929 FIS Nordic World Ski Championships in Zakopane.

Kleppen was born in Bø, Telemark in March 1907. He turned 100 in March 2007 and, having participated in the 1928 Winter Olympics, was Norway's oldest living Olympian.

References

External links
 
 
 
  
 Notice of death from Aftenposten

1907 births
2009 deaths
People from Bø, Telemark
Norwegian centenarians
Norwegian male ski jumpers
Ski jumpers at the 1928 Winter Olympics
Olympic ski jumpers of Norway
FIS Nordic World Ski Championships medalists in ski jumping
Men centenarians
Sportspeople from Vestfold og Telemark
20th-century Norwegian people